The following highways are numbered 158:

Argentina
 National Route 158

Brazil
 BR-158

Canada
 Prince Edward Island Route 158 (Harper Road)
 Quebec Route 158

Costa Rica
 National Route 158

Japan
 Japan National Route 158

United Kingdom
A158 road (Skegness - Horncastle - Wragby - Lincoln)

United States
 U.S. Route 158
 Alabama State Route 158
 Arkansas Highway 158
 California State Route 158
 Florida State Road 158 (former)
 Georgia State Route 158 (former)
 Georgia State Route 158
 Illinois Route 158
 Indiana State Road 158
 Kentucky Route 158
 Louisiana Highway 158
 Maine State Route 158
 Maryland Route 158
 M-158 (Michigan highway) (former)
 Missouri Route 158
 Nevada State Route 158
 New Jersey Route 158 (former)
 New Mexico State Road 158
 New York State Route 158
 Ohio State Route 158
 Pennsylvania Route 158
 South Dakota Highway 158
 Tennessee State Route 158
 Texas State Highway 158
 Texas State Highway Spur 158
 Utah State Route 158
 Virginia State Route 158
 Wisconsin Highway 158
 Wyoming Highway 158
Territories
 Puerto Rico Highway 158 (unbuilt)